The AeroJames 01 Isatis (named for the flowering plant) is a French ultralight aircraft, designed and produced by AeroJames of Ajaccio, Corsica. It was introduced at the Aero show held in Friedrichshafen in 2009. The aircraft is supplied as a complete ready-to-fly-aircraft.

By the beginning of 2018 company website was for sale, the company seems to have gone out of business and production ended.

Design and development
The design is unusual in that the engine is mounted behind the cabin and drives the nose-mounted propeller though a carbon fibre extension driveshaft that is housed in a casing that runs between the two occupants. This allows a smaller and more pointed nose than with a nose-mounted engine and improves visibility.

The aircraft was designed to comply with the Fédération Aéronautique Internationale microlight rules. It features a strut-braced high-wing, a two-seats-in-side-by-side configuration enclosed cockpit, tricycle landing gear and a single engine in tractor configuration.

The aircraft is made from carbon fibre composites. Its  span wing employs flaps. The standard engine used is a  BMW four-stroke, two-cylinder, air-cooled, horizontally-opposed motorcycle powerplant.

Specifications (01 Isatis)

References

External links
Official website archives on Archive.org

2000s French ultralight aircraft
Single-engined tractor aircraft